State Highway 5 (SH 5) is a State Highway in Kerala, India that starts in Kayamkulam and ends at punalur. The highway is 42.5 km long. This highway is also called as KP Road or Kayamkulam - Punalur Road and the road helps interstate transportation between Alappuzha district and Tenkasi, Tuticorin.

Route description 
Kayamkulam - Kattanam - Charumood - Nooranad junction -Pazhakulam junction - Adoor - Pathanapuram - Kallumkadavu junction (meet and ends at Main Eastern Highway (SH 8)).

See also 
Roads in Kerala
List of State Highways in Kerala

References 

State Highways in Kerala
Roads in Alappuzha district